This article shows a list of cities, towns and villages in New Caledonia.

Major cities and towns
Provincial capitals are shown in bold.

Hamlets (Lieux-dits)
The villages or hamlets of New Caledonia are ordered by municipality (commune) and province. Municipal seats (chef-lieu) are shown in the list.

South Province

Bouloupari
Bouloupari (chef-lieu)
Bouraké
Gilles
Kouerga
Nassirah
Nétéa
Ouaméni
Ouinané
Ouitchambo
Tomo

Bourail
Azareu
Bouirou
Gouaro
Nandaï
Néméara
Nessadiou
Ny
Oua-Oué
Potê

Dumbéa
Dumbéa (chef-lieu)
Koutio
Nondoué
Yahoué

Farino
Farino (chef-lieu)
Fonwhary

La Foa
La Foa (chef-lieu)
Coindé
Forêt Noire
Oua-Tom
Oui-Poin
Pocquereux Kouma

L'Île-des-Pins
Comagna
Gadji
Kotomo
Ouatchia
Touete
Vao
Wapan
Wapwangâ
Youati

Moindou
Mouidou (chef-lieu)
Kéré
Moméa
Téremba

Le Mont-Dore
Le Mont-Dore (chef-lieu)
La Capture
La Conception
La Coulée
Ouara
Plum
Prony
Saint-Louis

Nouméa
Nouméa (capital and largest city)

Païta
Païta (chef-lieu)
Bangou
Col de la pirogue
Katiranoma
Kokoréta
Makou
Naniouni
N'dé
Onghoué
Plaine-Aux-Cailloux
Port Laguerre
Sanatorium
Saint-Laurent
Tamoa
Timbia
Tongouin
Tontouta

Sarraméa
Sarraméa (chef-lieu)
Petit Couli
Grand Couli

Thio
Thio (chef-lieu)
Grand Borendy
Petit Borendy
Ouindo
Les Pétroglyphes
Saint-Jean-Baptiste
Saint-Joseph
Saint-Michel
Saint-Paul
Saint-Pierre
Saint-Roch
Saint-Philippo 1
Saint-Philippo 2

Yaté
Yaté (chef-lieu)
Goro
Touaourou
Unia
Waho

North Province

Belep
 Waala

Canala
Nakéty
Emma
Haouli
Koh
Négropo
Ouassé

Hienghène
Hienghène (chef-lieu)

Houaïlou
Houaïlou (chef-lieu)

Kaala-Gomen
Kaala-Gomen (chef-lieu)
Tiebaghi

Koné
Koné (chef-lieu)

Kouaoua
Kouaoua (chef-lieu)
Kanoé-Chaoué
Méa-Mébara
Wabe
Wénèè

Koumac
Koumac (chef-lieu)

Ouégoa
Ouégoa (chef-lieu)

Poindimié
Poindimié (chef-lieu)

Ponérihouen
Ponérihouen (chef-lieu)

Pouébo
Pouébo (chef-lieu)

Pouembout
Pouembout (chef-lieu)

Poum
Poum (chef-lieu)

Poya
Poya (chef-lieu)
Muéo
Napoua

Touho
Touho (chef-lieu)

Voh
Voh (chef-lieu)

Loyalty Islands Province

Ouvéa
Fayaoué
Mouli
Imone
Saint Joseph
Takedji

Lifou
Gaica
Lösi
Wetr
Wé

Maré
Eni
Guahma
Medu
Pénélo
Hnawayaca
Kaewatine
Menaku
Padawa
La Roche
Roh
Tadine
Tawainèdre
Tenane
Thogone
Wabao
Wakuarori

See also
 Communes of New Caledonia
 French overseas departments and territories
 Administrative divisions of France
 Islands controlled by France in the Indian and Pacific oceans

References

External links

 
New Caledonia
New Caledonia-related lists